Eschiva of Saint Omer (died 1265), was a Princess regnant suo jure of Galilée in 1240-1247.

References

 Runciman, Steven (1990). A History of the Crusades, vol. II: The Kingdom of Jerusalem and the Frankish East 1100-1187

Countesses of Tripoli
13th-century women rulers
Princes of Galilee
Year of birth unknown